Berwind is a town on the Dry Fork in McDowell County, West Virginia, United States. As of the 2010 census, its population is 278. The town is named for Edward Julius Berwind, owner of the Berwind Company, and was originally a company town. It was later incorporated in 1905. Berwind is the hometown of Vern Bickford, a starting pitcher in Major League Baseball who played with the Braves in Boston (1948-1952) and Milwaukee (1953), and for the Baltimore Orioles (1954).  Berwind is also encompassed by the Berwind census designated place.

Berwind is on the Norfolk Southern Railway(former Norfolk and Western) network and the Tug Fork river.

References

External links 
The Road to Berwind: A Collection of Pictures and Articles
Berwind Elementary School
Coalfields of the Appalachian Mountains - Berwind, WV
Berwind House of Praise

Census-designated places in McDowell County, West Virginia
Census-designated places in West Virginia
Coal towns in West Virginia
Company towns in West Virginia
Berwind Corporation